Hellen Adoa (born 25 January 1977), is a Ugandan politician who serves as the  Member of Parliament representing the women in Serere District in the 10th Ugandan Parliament (2016 to 2021).

Effective 14 December 2019, she concurrently serves as the State Minister for Fisheries, in the Ugandan Cabinet.

Background and education
She was born in Serere District, in the Teso sub-region, in the Eastern Region of Uganda, on 25 January 1977. She attended Kelim Primary School. She studied at Ngora Girls Secondary School, for her O-Level studies, graduating with a Uganda Certificate of Education, in 1992. In 1995, she completed her A-Level education at Ngora High School, graduating with a Uganda Advanced Certificate of Education.

She has two diplomas; one a Diploma in Business Studies, was awarded by Victoria Business Institute, Tororo, and the other is a Diploma in Education Management, from Uganda Martyrs University. Her first degree, a Bachelor of Democracy and Development Studies and her second degree, a Master of Local Governance and Human Rights, were both awarded by Uganda Martyrs University.

Career before politics
For a period of 15 years, from the beginning of 2001 until the end of 2015, Hellen Adoa served as director at various early childhood and elementary educational institutions, some of them co-owned by her. She also is a director at Halcyon High School.

Political career
She entered Uganda's elective politics by contesting for the Serere District Women Constituency parliamentary seat in 2016. She was elected, and is the current substantive member of parliament for that Serere District. She subscribes to the ruling National Resistance Movement political party.

On 14 December 2019, she was named in the cabinet of Uganda as the minister of state for Fisheries; a position she was appointed to by the Head of State of Uganda Yoweri Kaguta Museveni. She was sworn in as State Minister for Fisheries on 13 January 2020.

See also
 Margaret Lamwaka Odwar
 Molly Nawe Kamukama
Serere District
List of members of the tenth Parliament of Uganda
Parliament of Uganda
Patrick Okabe
Elijah Okupa

References

External links
Website of Parliament of Uganda

1977 births
Living people
Itesot people
People from Serere District
People from Eastern Region, Uganda
Members of the Parliament of Uganda
21st-century Ugandan women politicians
21st-century Ugandan politicians
Government ministers of Uganda
Uganda Martyrs University alumni
National Resistance Movement politicians
Women government ministers of Uganda
Women members of the Parliament of Uganda